Lakshitha de Silva (born Muthumuni Raween Lakshitha de Silva on 30 April 1990) is a Sri Lankan cricketer. He is a right-handed batsman and right-arm medium-fast bowler who plays for Seeduwa Raddoluwa Sports Club. He was born in Chilaw. Lakshitha de Silva studied at Royal College, Colombo.

De Silva, who played for the Under-23s team during the 2009 season, made his List A debut in 2009–10, against Sri Lanka Navy Sports Club. In the first innings in which he batted, he scored 26 runs.

External links
Lakshitha de Silva at CricketArchive 

1990 births
Living people
Sri Lankan cricketers
Seeduwa Raddoluwa Cricket Club cricketers